Dzembronia is a village in the Verkhovyna Raion of the Ivano-Frankivsk Oblast of Ukraine. It is located in the southeast of the Chornohora. It forms part of Zelene rural hromada, one of the hromadas of Ukraine.

Geography
It is regarded as the highest village in Ukraine.

History
On 1 April 1928, the hamlets of Dzembronia, Bystrets, Zelene, and Yavirnyk were separated from the commune of Żabie (Verkhovyna) of Kosiv Poviat, and the self-governing village of Dzembronia was thus formed. In 1939, 1,750 residents lived in the village (1,600 Greek-Catholic Ukrainians, 110 Latin Ukrainians, 40 Poles).

After it was annexed by the Soviet Union, the village was renamed Berestetska Dzembronia, and on June 7, 1946, by decree of the Presidium of the Verkhovna Rada of the Ukrainian SSR, the village of was changed to Berestechko. On 4 June 2009, by a resolution of the Verkhovna Rada, the village of Berestechko was changed back to Dzembronia.

Demographics
According to the 1989 census, the population of Dzembronia was 258, of which 118 were men and 140 were women. According to the 2001 census, 242 people lived in the village.

Languages
Native language as of the Ukrainian Census of 2001:

Religion
In Dzembronia there is a monastery of the Transfiguration of the Lord Jesus Christ of the UGCC, as well as the Church of St. Dimitriy of Thessalonica (OCU), built in 1997. In July 2017, the OCU church was consecrated in honor of Saint Olga.

References

1928 establishments in Ukraine
Populated places established in 1928
Villages in Verkhovyna Raion